Mark Hammond may refer to:

 Mark Hammond (American politician) (born 1963), South Carolina Secretary of State
 Mark Hammond (Australian politician) (1844–1908)
 Mark Hammond (director), film producer and director, see Johnny Was
 Mark Hammond, the main character in the video game series The Getaway
Mark Hammond, a fictional character in Z Nation
 Mark Hammond (admiral), a senior officer in the Royal Australian Navy.

See also
 Mark Harmon